Kinza Malik is a Pakistani actress. She is known for her roles in dramas Qayamat, Sammi, Alif Allah Aur Insaan, Ishqiya, Phaans and Neeli Zinda Hai.

Early life
She was born in 1972 on March 08 in Lahore, Pakistan.

Career
She made her debut as an actress on PTV in 1990s and appeared in dramas on PTV. She was noted for her roles in dramas Adhi Dhoop, Chingaarian, Kalmoohi and Bhool. She also appeared in dramas Gustakh Ishq, Aik Thi Rania, Dar Si Jaati Hai Sila, Ishq Tamasha, Sammi and Alif Allah Aur Insaan. Since then she appeared in dramas Sanwari, Baandi, Saraab, Lashkara, Qayamat, Ishqiya and Neeli Zinda Hai, Phaans. In 2011 she appeared in movie Khamosh Raho.

Personal life
Kinza is married and has three children.

Filmography

Television

Film

References

External links
 
 

1972 births
Living people
20th-century Pakistani actresses
Pakistani television actresses
21st-century Pakistani actresses
Pakistani film actresses